Henry O (born July 7, 1927) is a former Chinese-American actor. He is the father of Ji-li Jiang, the author of Red Scarf Girl.

O was born in Shanghai in 1927 and attended British and American missionary schools in China. He worked as a stage actor in China before switching to film work after moving to the United States.

During the Cultural Revolution he was falsely accused of counter-revolutionary crimes and was detained and forced to do hard labor by the Chinese government.

Personal life

O and his family left China and settled in the United States in the 1980s to take care of his daughter Ji-yun's children. Henry O is his stage named and is derived from O. Henry.

O resides in San Francisco area and is married to Ying Chen. They have three children including Jiang Ji-yong, Jiang Ji-yun and author Ji-li Jiang. O is fluent in both English and Mandarin Chinese.

Filmography

Most of O's credits after 1983 are after his arrival to the United States.

Television

 Marco Polo (1983) – astrologer
 The West Wing (2000) – Jhin Wei in "Shibboleth"
 ER (2004) – Mr. Chen in episodes "White Guy, Dark Hair" and "Twas the Night"
 The Sopranos (2006) – Monk #1 in episodes "Mayham" and "Join the Club"

Film
 Premium Rush (2012) – Mr. Leung
 2012 (2009) – Lama Rinpoche
 Rush Hour 3 (2007) – Master Yu
 A Thousand Years of Good Prayers (2007) – Mr Shi
 They Wait (2007) – Pharmacist
 Avatar (2004) – Uncle Hui 
 Shanghai Noon (2000) – Royal Interpreter 
 Romeo Must Die (2000) – Ch'u Sing, father of Han Sing 
 Dragonheart: A New Beginning (2000) – Master Kwan
 Snow Falling on Cedars (1999) – Nagaishi
 Brokedown Palace (1999) – Emissary to Crown 
 Red Corner (1997) – Procurator General Yang 
 American Shaolin (1992) – Master San De
 The Last Emperor (1987) – Lord Chamberlain

References

1927 births
Possibly living people
Chinese emigrants to the United States
Male actors from Shanghai
Film directors from Shanghai
Chinese male television actors
Chinese male film actors